The 2021 Alpine Elf Europa Cup is the fourth season of the Alpine Elf Europa Cup, the one-make sports car racing series organized by Alpine for Alpine A110 Cup cars. It began on 3 April at Nogaro will finish on 24 October at Portimão.

Calendar
The final calendar was announced on December 14, 2020, featuring six rounds.

Entry list

Race results
Bold indicates overall winner.

Championship standings
Scoring System
Points are awarded to the top 20 drivers. If less than 75% of the race distance is completed then half points are awarded. If less than two laps are completed then no points are given. 
Drivers' Championship

Gentlemen's Championship

Drivers' Championship

Gentlemen's Championship

Notes

References

External links
Official Website

Alpine Elf Europa Cup seasons
Alpine Elf Europa Cup
Alpine Elf Europa Cup